Ohkay Owingeh (Tewa: Ohkwee Ówîngeh ), known by its Spanish name as San Juan de los Caballeros from 1589 to 2005, is a pueblo and census-designated place (CDP) in Rio Arriba County, New Mexico. Ohkay Owingeh is also a federally recognized tribe of Pueblo people inhabiting the town.

Name
Ohkay Owingeh was previously known as San Juan Pueblo until returning to its pre-Spanish name in November 2005. The Tewa name of the pueblo means "place of the strong people".

Ohkay Owingeh has the ZIP code 87566 and the U.S. Postal Service prefers that name for addressing mail, but accepts the alternative name San Juan Pueblo.

The community was also formally known as the San Juan Indian Reservation.

Geography

History 
The pueblo was founded around 1200 AD during the Pueblo III Era. By tradition, the Tewa people moved here from the north, perhaps from the San Luis Valley of southern Colorado, part of a great migration spanning into the Pueblo IV Era.

Spanish colonial capital
In March 1598, conquistador Oñate traveled from north central Mexico, accompanied by a caravan of Catholic missionaries, a thousand soldiers, colonists, and Tlaxcalan Mexican Indians. The expedition included cattle, sheep, goats, oxen, and horses, and arrived at Yungeh—place of the mockingbird—in present-day Ohkay Owingeh on July 11, 1598.

The people who met him that day, it is written, were hospitable and offered Yuque Yunque pueblo as guest quarters to Oñate and his party. On July 12, 1598, he baptized and renamed Caypa pueblo (present-day Ohkay Owingeh) San Juan de los Caballeros, after his patron saint John the Baptist. San Juan de los Caballeros became the first capital of the New Spain colony of Santa Fe de Nuevo Méjico. In local history, it is said the event united the two fragmented families of Caypa and Yuque Yunque. Since their arrival from earlier homelands in the northwest, the two pueblos had been divided by the river, split until the expedition party's arrival. When the community offered Yuque Yunque pueblo on the west bank to Oñate, the two fragmented pueblos were made whole again at Caypa. The Spanish capital would be moved in 1610 to La Villa Real de la Santa Fe de San Francisco de Asís.

Popé was a local man who rose to be one of the most regarded leaders of American Indian history. He would play a major role in the Pueblo revolt in 1680.

Modern era 
Ohkay Owingeh is the headquarters of the Eight Northern Indian Pueblos Council, and the pueblo people are from the Tewa ethnic group of American Indians. It is one of the largest Tewa-speaking pueblos.<ref
  name= oop    >
     "Ohkay Owingeh Pueblo".
  New Mexico, Land of Enchantment.
  New Mexico Tourism Department.
  Retrieved March 15, 2014.
</ref>

The annual Pueblo Feast Day is June 24. For all pueblos, the actual feast day includes a Catholic mass that is held in the morning. Because of historical relations with the Catholic Church, all pueblos have a church located near the center of the village. Most Pueblo people practice aspects of both the Catholic religion and Pueblo belief systems. The tribe owns the Ohkay Casino and the Oke-Oweenge Crafts Cooperative, which showcases redware pottery, weaving, painting, and other artwork from the eight northern pueblos.

Demographics
, 1,480 people were estimated to be living in the CDP, with 6,690 in the surrounding Census County Division. The 2010 census found that 1,522 people in the U.S. described themselves as exclusively Ohkay Owingeh and 1,770 as Ohkay Owingeh exclusively or in combination with another group.

Education
It is in the Española Public Schools district. The comprehensive public high school is Española Valley High School.

Notable natives 
 Emiliano Abeyta, painter
 Juan B. Aquino, painter
Lorencita Atencio, painter and textile artist
 Rose Gonzales, potter
 Evelina Zuni Lucero, writer
 Esther Martinez, linguist and storyteller
 Popé, Tewa leader of the Pueblo Revolt of 1680
 Alfonso Ortiz, professor and cultural anthropologist
 Leonidas Tapia, potter

Gallery

See also

 National Register of Historic Places listings in Rio Arriba County, New Mexico
 Ohkay Owingeh Airport

References 

Joe Garcia, Pueblo leader, ready to take on NCAI
Tuesday, November 15, 2005
https://www.indianz.com/News/2005/011282.asp

External links 

 Ohkay Owingeh Dept. of Education
 History of Ohkay Owingeh
 Los Matachines at Ohkay Owingeh, photo gallery
 Ohkay Owingeh, Indian Pueblo Cultural Center
 San Juan Pueblo at National Park Service
 San Juan pottery, photo gallery

American Indian reservations in New Mexico
Federally recognized tribes in the United States
Geography of Rio Arriba County, New Mexico
Native American tribes in New Mexico
Pueblo great houses
Tewa
Unincorporated communities in New Mexico
Northern Rio Grande National Heritage Area
Unincorporated communities in Rio Arriba County, New Mexico
Historic districts on the National Register of Historic Places in New Mexico
National Register of Historic Places in Rio Arriba County, New Mexico
Pueblos on the National Register of Historic Places in New Mexico